Richard Henry Bagnall-Oakeley aka Oakeley (12 November 1865 – 5 July 1947) was a Welsh archer who competed at the 1908 Summer Olympics in London. He was born in Penallt, Monmouthshire, Wales.

Life
Bagnall-Oakeley was baptised on 23 November 1865 as the youngest child of the Reverend William and Mary Ellen Bagnall-Oakeley.
Bagnall-Oakeley entered the double York round event in 1908, taking 21st place with 374 points. He also participated in the Continental style event but his result is unknown. He was a member of the Royal Toxophilite Society. He died on 5 July 1947 at a nursing home in Gloucestershire.

Family
He married  Augusta Robina Bolden (1866–1961) in October 1895 in Monmouthshire, Wales. They had 3 children:
 Leoline Richard Bagnall-Oakeley (1897–1972)
 Rachel Bagnall-Oakeley (1900–1978)
 John Rowland Bagnall-Oakeley (1904–1977)

Sources

Buchanan, Ian  British Olympians. Guinness Publishing (1991) 
 
 
 http://www.wikitree.com/wiki/Category:Bagnall-Oakeley_Name_Study

Sportspeople from Monmouth, Wales
Welsh male archers
Archers at the 1908 Summer Olympics
Olympic archers of Great Britain
1865 births
1947 deaths